This is a list of the 1972 PGA Tour Qualifying School graduates.

The event was held at Silverado Country Club, South course, in Napa, California in late October/early November. After three 72-hole regional qualifiers, there were 81 players in the 108-hole final qualifying tournament.

Tournament summary 
Larry Stubblefield and John Adams tied for the lead and Stubblefield won a sudden-death playoff for the top position. A total of 25 players earned their tour card. Joe Inman, who recently graduated from Wake Forest University, participated in his first Q-school. However, he did not successfully graduate onto the PGA Tour.

List of graduates 

Sources:

References

PGA Tour Qualifying School
Golf in California
PGA Tour Qualifying School Graduates
PGA Tour Qualifying School Graduates